Loolego is a former Yurok settlement in Humboldt County, California. It was located on the Lower Klamath River 2 mi (3.2 km) above the fork with the Trinity River.  Sherburne F. Cook wrote that the population of Loolego declined rapidly after white settlement.

References

Former settlements in Humboldt County, California
Former Native American populated places in California
Yurok villages
Lost Native American populated places in the United States